An argument from anecdote is an informal logical fallacy, where anecdotal evidence is presented as an argument; without any other contributory evidence or reasoning. This type of argument is considered as an informal logical fallacy as it is unpersuasive – since the anecdote could be made up, misconstrued or be a statistical outlier which is insignificant when further evidence is considered. This fallacy can often be found in conjunction with the hasty generalisation fallacy – where the hasty generalisation is made from unsubstantiated anecdotes.

Examples 

Whilst this argument is logically valid – as, if the premise is true, the conclusion must also be true; it may not be logically sound. The premise (which is purely anecdotal) could have been made up to support this person's argument, or the god seen in the dream could have simply been part of the dream. The validity of the premise cannot be deduced, as it is anecdotal.

This is an example of the hasty generalisation fallacy working with an argument from anecdote. This argument is poor as: a) It is difficult to deduce the truthfulness or validity of the premise b) even if someone did die after smoking marijuana, one isolated case does not mean that it is as dangerous as the argument claims, without further evidence this is a hasty generalisation and c) this claim uses the post hoc fallacy; just because someone died after smoking marijuana, that does not mean that the marijuana caused the death.

References

Fallacies